The 51st Bombardment Squadron, Light is an inactive squadron of the United States Air Force last based at Birmingham Municipal Airport, Alabama.  The squadron served on antisubmarine patrol early in World War II, then as a training unit until it was disbanded in 1944.

The squadron was reactivated in the Air Force Reserve in 1947.  It was called to active service in March 1951 for the Korean War and its personnel used as fillers for other units.  The 51st was inactivated on 20 March 1951.

History

World War II
The squadron was first activated as the 51st Bombardment Squadron (Light) in 1941.  It was one of the four original squadrons of the 46th Bombardment Group.  The 51st was equipped with Douglas A-20 Havoc aircraft at Hunter Field, Georgia. The 51st participated in maneuvers, After the entry of the United States into the war, the squadron 
briefly deployed to Army Air Base, Manchester, New Hampshire.but then moved to Barksdale Field, Louisiana, and to Galveston Army Air Field, Texas, from which it flew anti-submarine warfare patrol and search missions over the Gulf of Mexico until May 1942.

It moved to Blythe Army Air Base, California, where it participated in desert maneuvers. It then served as an Operational Training Unit (OTU) at Will Rogers Field, Oklahoma.  OTUs were oversized parent units that provided cadres for "satellite groups." In late 1943 the squadron moved to Morris Field, North Carolina and its mission changed to replacement training of individual pilots and aircrews. Just before disbanding, the squadron began to convert to North American B-25 Mitchells.

However, the Army Air Forces found that standard military units, based on relatively inflexible tables of organization were proving less well adapted to the training mission.  Accordingly, a more functional system was adopted in which each base was organized into a separate numbered unit. This resulted in the squadron, along with other units at Morris Field, being disbanded and its personnel, equipment and functions transferred to the 333d AAF Base Unit (Replacement Training Unit, Light Bombardment).

Air Force reserve

The squadron was reconstituted and activated in the reserve under Air Defense Command (ADC) at Mitchel Field, New York in July 1947 and assigned to the 319th Bombardment Group. At Mitchel, the squadron trained under the supervision of the 113th AAF Base Unit (later the 2230 Air Force Reserve Training Center), although it is not clear whether it was fully manned or equipped during this period.  In July 1948 Continental Air Command (ConAC) assumed responsibility for managing reserve and Air National Guard units from ADC. The 51st's stay at Mitchel ended when ConAC reorganized its reserve units under the wing base organization system in June 1949.

The squadron moved on paper to Reading Municipal Airport, Pennsylvania, where it replaced elements of the 322d Bombardment Group. At Reading, the squadron trained under the supervision of the 2237th Air Force Reserve Training Center.  The squadron was authorized manning of only 25% of normal strength. Runway length at Reading, however, led ConAC to decide to station a troop carrier unit there, and the squadron was inactivated on 2 October 1949 and its personnel were transferred to the 328th Troop Carrier Squadron.
 
The squadron activated again about a month later, on 10 October 1949, at Birmingham Municipal Airport, Alabama, where it replaced the 337th Troop Carrier Squadron. The squadron flew the Douglas B-26 Invader at Birmingham, where training was conducted by the 2587th Air Force Reserve Training Center. All reserve combat and corollary units were mobilized for the Korean War, and the 51st was called up on 10 March 1951.  Its personnel and aircraft were used as fillers for other units, and the squadron was inactivated on 22 March.

Lineage
 Constituted as the 51st Bombardment Squadron (Light) on 20 November 1940
 Activated on 15 January 1941
 Disbanded on 1 May 1944
 Reconstituted and redesignated 51st Bombardment Squadron, Light on 26 May 1947
 Activated in the reserve on 9 July 1947
 Inactivated on 2 September 1949
 Activated on 10 October 1949
 Inactivated on 22 March 1951

Assignments
 46th Bombardment Group: 15 January 1941  – 1 May 1944
 319th Bombardment Group: 9 July 1947 – 2 September 1949
 319th Bombardment Group: 10 October 1949 – 22 March 1951

Stations
 Hunter Field, Georgia, 15 January 1941
 Bowman Field, Kentucky, 17 May 1941
 Army Air Base, Manchester, New Hampshire, 12 December 1941 
 Bowman Field, Kentucky, 13 January 1942
 Barksdale Field, Louisiana, 2 February 1942
 Galveston Army Air Field, Texas, 31 March 1942
 Blythe Army Air Base, California, 17 May 1942
 Will Rogers Field, Oklahoma, 12 November 1942
 Drew Field, Florida, 8 October 1943
 Morris Field, North Carolina, 6 November 1943 – 1 May 1944
 Mitchel Field, New York, 9 July 1947
 Reading Municipal Airport, Pennsylvania, 27 June 1949 – 2 September 1949
 Birmingham Municipal Airport, Alabama, 10 October 1949 – 22 March 1951

Aircraft and Launch Vehicles Operated
 Douglas A-20 Havoc, 1941–1944
 North American B-25 Mitchell, 1944
 Douglas B-26 Invader, 1949–1951

Campaign

See also

 List of Douglas A-20 Havoc operators

References

Notes

Bibliography

 
 
 
 
 
 
  

Military units and formations established in 1941
051
051
Military units and formations disestablished in 1944
Military units and formations established in 1947